The 2016 United States Senate election in Georgia was held November 8, 2016, to elect a member of the United States Senate to represent the State of Georgia, concurrently with the 2016 U.S. presidential election, as well as other elections to the United States Senate in other states and elections to the United States House of Representatives and various state and local elections. The primary election for the Republican and Democratic parties took place on May 24, 2016.

Incumbent Republican Senator Johnny Isakson won re-election to a third term in office by a wide margin. Isakson resigned from the Senate on December 31, 2019, due to health issues. As of 2022, this remains the last time that a Republican has won a Senate election in Georgia, as well as the last time that suburban Gwinnett and Henry counties have voted for a Republican in a statewide election. It also remains the last time that any statewide candidate has won an election in Georgia by double-digits, and the last time that any U.S. Senate candidate in Georgia has won without a runoff.

Republican primary

Candidates

Declared 
 Mary Kay Bacallao, college professor, former Fayette County Board of Education member and candidate for State Superintendent of Schools in 2014
 Derrick Grayson, MARTA engineer, minister and candidate for the U.S. Senate in 2014
 Johnny Isakson, incumbent U.S. Senator

Withdrawn 
 Lee Benedict, teacher and state senate candidate in 2007 (running for the Columbia County Commission)

Declined 
 Paul Broun, former U.S. Representative and candidate for the U.S. Senate in 1996 and 2014 (running for GA-09)
 Tom Graves, U.S. Representative
 Kelly Loeffler, owner of the Atlanta Dream and future U.S. Senator for this seat
 Tom Price, U.S. Representative
 Allen West, former U.S. Representative from Florida

Endorsements

Polling

Results

Democratic primary

Candidates

Declared 
 James F. Barksdale, investment firm executive
 Cheryl Copeland, AT&T manager
 John Coyne, businessman and perennial candidate

Withdrawn 
 Jim Knox, information technologist and United States Air Force veteran

Declined 
 Stacey Abrams, Minority Leader of the Georgia House of Representatives
 Thurbert Baker, former Attorney General of Georgia and candidate for governor in 2010
 Roy Barnes, former governor
 John Barrow, former U.S. Representative
 Jason Carter, state senator and nominee for Governor of Georgia in 2014
 Stacey Evans, state representative
 Shirley Franklin, former Mayor of Atlanta
 Scott Holcomb, state representative and candidate for secretary of state in 2006
 Margaret Kaiser, state representative
 Jim Marshall, former U.S. Representative
 Michelle Nunn, former CEO of Points of Light and nominee for the U.S. Senate in 2014
 Kasim Reed, Mayor of Atlanta
 Michael Sterling, executive director of the Atlanta Workforce Development Agency, former Assistant United States Attorney and former adviser to Mayor Kasim Reed
 Doug Stoner, former state senator
 Ed Tarver, United States Attorney for the Southern District of Georgia and former state senator
 Regina Thomas, former state senator and candidate for GA-12 in 2008 and 2010
 Teresa Tomlinson, Mayor of Columbus
 Raphael Warnock, pastor of Ebenezer Baptist Church and future U.S. Senator for this seat
 Valarie Wilson, former president of the Georgia School Boards Association, former chair of the Decatur School Board, and nominee for State Superintendent of Schools in 2014

Results

Libertarian nomination

Candidates

Declared 
 Allen Buckley, attorney, accountant, nominee for the U.S. Senate in 2004 and 2008 and nominee for Lieutenant Governor of Georgia in 2006
 Ted Metz, insurance agent, former Cobb County Republican district chairman, and nominee for insurance commissioner in 2014

Allen Buckley won the nomination at the March 5, 2016, nominating convention in Marietta

General election

Debates

Polling

Predictions

Results

References

External links 
Official campaign websites
 Johnny Isakson (R) for Senate
 Jim Barksdale (D) for Senate
 Allen Buckley (L) for Senate

2016
Georgia (U.S. state)
2016 Georgia (U.S. state) elections